Miss Europe 2019 was the 62nd edition of the Miss Europe pageant and the fourth under the Miss Europe Organization. It was held at Hotel Martinez in Cannes, France, on May 17, 2019. Andrea de las Heras of Spain, was crowned Miss Europe 2019 by out going titleholders Anastasiya Ammosova of Russia & Anna Shornikova of Ukraine. The pageant took place during the Cannes Film Festival in Cannes, France.

Results

Placements

Contestants 

 - UNKNOWN
 - Tauany Coelho
 - Julia Hunt
 - Linda Novica
 - Andrea de las Heras

References

External links 
 

Miss Europe
2019 beauty pageants
May 2019 events in France